Quarouble is a commune in the Nord department in northern France.

Heraldry

Population

1954 incident
An alien encounter was reported in the commune in 1954; see Marius Dewilde. Calcinated rock was reportedly found at the site of the incident and some witnesses reported experiencing missing time.

See also
Communes of the Nord department

References

Communes of Nord (French department)